Richard Pryor: Live on the Sunset Strip is the seventeenth album by American comedian Richard Pryor. Produced by Pryor and Biff Dawes, the album was released alongside the comedian's film of the same name in 1982. The material includes Pryor's frank discussion of his drug addiction and of the night that he caught on fire while freebasing cocaine in 1980. The album later won the Grammy Award for Best Comedy Recording in 1982.

Track listing 
 "Women" – 11:24
 "Prison" – 6:25
 "Africa" – 10:33
 "Mafia Club" – 6:04
 "Mudbone" – 7:38 from Tupelo, Mississippi
 "Freebase" – 8:12
 "Hospital" – 10:17

Recording locations 
 Tracks 1–4 and 6–7 recorded at the Circle Star Theater in San Carlos, California, December 1981 (except track 3, recorded in October 1981).
 Track 5 recorded at The Hollywood Palladium in Hollywood, California, January 5, 1982.
 Location recording by Wally Heider Recording, engineers Biff Dawes, Jack Crymes and Bill Broms.

References

External links 
 
  Roger Ebert's review

1982 live albums
Grammy Award for Best Comedy Album
Richard Pryor live albums
Stand-up comedy albums
Spoken word albums by American artists
Warner Records live albums